Dərəkənd (also, Darakend and Derekend) is a village and municipality in the Gobustan Rayon of Azerbaijan.  It has a population of 378.

References 

Populated places in Gobustan District